Keetia purpurascens is a species of flowering plants in the family Rubiaceae. It is endemic to Tanzania.

Sources 

Endemic flora of Tanzania
purpurascens
Vulnerable plants
Taxonomy articles created by Polbot
Taxa named by Diane Mary Bridson